A.S.D. Sasso Marconi 1924 is an Italian association football club located in Sasso Marconi, Bologna. It currently plays in Serie D.

History 
The club was founded in 2006, but merged from Sasso Marconi and Axys Zola. Therefore, they were reinstated in Serie D from the 2019–20 season.

Colors and badge
The team's colors are yellow and blue.

References

External links 
 Official site

Football clubs in Italy
Association football clubs established in 2019
2019 establishments in Italy
Serie D clubs